Annus mirabilis (pl. anni mirabiles) is a Latin phrase that means "marvelous  year", "wonderful year", "miraculous year", “year of wonder” or "amazing year". This term has been used to refer to several years during which events of major importance are remembered, notably Isaac Newton's discoveries in 1666.

1345-1346 — Edward III 

Eight years after the start of the Hundred Years' War large-scale fighting had died down. Edward III of England decided to renew the war more vigorously in 1345. He despatched a small force to Gascony in south-west France under Henry, Earl of Derby and personally led the main English army to northern France. Edward delayed the disembarkation of his army and his fleet was scattered by a storm, rendering this offensive ineffective. Derby was spectacularly successful, winning victories at Bergerac and Auberoche. The following spring a large French army, led by the heir to the French throne, John, Duke of Normandy, counter-attacked Derby's forces. 

Edward responded by landing an army of 10,000 men in northern Normandy. The English devastated much of Normandy and stormed and sacked Caen, slaughtering the population. They cut a swath along the left bank of the Seine to within  of Paris. The English army then turned north and inflicted a heavy defeat on a French army led by their king, Philip VI, at the Battle of Crécy on 26 August 1346. They promptly exploited this by laying siege to Calais. The period from Derby's victory outside Bergerac in late August 1345 to the start of the siege of Calais on 4 September 1346 became known as Edward III's .

1492 — Catholic Monarchs
The Catholic Monarchs (Isabella I of Castile and Ferdinand II of Aragon) built in 1492 the most powerful monarchy in the Western World by the conquest of Granada, the final step of the Reconquista, on January 2, and, though this wonder began to manifest only upon the return of Columbus the next year, the discovery of the Americas on October 12. 1492 is also the year of construction of the first grammar of a modern language: Gramática de la lengua castellana; the author, Antonio de Nebrija (a prominent counselor of the Monarchs) said in it, comparing Spanish with Latin: siempre la lengua fue compañera del imperio ("language was always the companion of empire").

1543 — The year of science 

The beginning of the Scientific Revolution when:
 Andreas Vesalius published De humani corporis fabrica (On the Fabric of the Human Body) in Basel, which revolutionised the science of human anatomy and the practice of medicine.
 Nicolaus Copernicus published De revolutionibus orbium coelestium (On the Revolutions of the Heavenly Spheres) in Nuremberg, Germany.

1625 — Spanish Monarchy 

A series of Spanish military victories on a global strategic scale obtained in 1625 during the Thirty Years' War, in important military theaters in Europe and America. These military victories were as follows: Siege of Breda, Relief of Genoa, Recapture of Bahia, Battle of San Juan and Defense of Cádiz. Those military actions were immortalized in a series of paintings in the Hall of Realms of the Buen Retiro Palace in Madrid. Thus, the “reputational” policy promoted by the Gaspar de Guzmán, Count-Duke of Olivares, favourite of Philip IV of Spain, was apparently confirmed by the initial success, and it was in reference to this annus mirabilis for Spanish arms that Olivares delivered probably his most famous pronouncement: "God is Spanish and fights for Spain."

1644-1645 — Montrose 
The military successes of James Graham, 1st Marquess of Montrose in Scotland in the War of the Three Kingdoms during 1644–1645 are sometimes called "annus mirabilis".

1666 — The year of wonders 
In 1666, Isaac Newton, aged 23, made revolutionary inventions and discoveries in calculus, motion, optics and gravitation. It was in this year that Newton was alleged to have observed an apple falling from a tree, and in which he in any case hit upon the law of universal gravitation (Newton's apple). He was afforded the time to work on his theories due to the closure of Cambridge University by an outbreak of plague.

1706 — Grand Alliance 

In 1706, the Grand Alliance arrayed against Louis XIV of France won resounding victories (the Battle of Ramillies and Siege of Turin) which, after the previous year's failures, has been termed by James Falkner a "Year of Miracles."

1759 — William Pitt 

A series of victories by the British military in 1759 in North America, Europe, India, and in various naval engagements, is occasionally referred to as William Pitt's annus mirabilis, and was the decisive year of the Seven Years' War.

1905 — Albert Einstein 

It was in this year that Albert Einstein, aged 26, published important discoveries concerning the photoelectric effect, Brownian motion, the special theory of relativity, and the famous E = mc2 equation. His four articles, collectively known as his Annus Mirabilis papers, were published in Annalen der Physik in 1905.

See also

 Annus mirabilis (Norway)
 Annus Mirabilis (poem)
 Annus horribilis
 List of Latin phrases

Notes

Bibliography

 Blanning, T.C.W.The Culture of Power the Power of Culture: Old Regime Europe 1660–1789. Oxford University Press, 2002.
 
 
 
 Monod, Paul Kléber. Imperial Island: A History of Britain and Its Empire, 1660–1837. Wiley-Blackwell, 2009.
 
 
 
 

Latin words and phrases
Physics papers